"On the Banks of the Old Raritan" is a song, or alma mater, associated with Rutgers, The State University of New Jersey (previously Rutgers College and Rutgers University), in the United States.  The original lyrics were written in 1873 by Howard Newton Fuller, an 1874 graduate of Rutgers College.  Fuller quickly prepared the song as a school hymn for the college's Glee Club, an all-male choral ensemble, before a performance in Metuchen, New Jersey.  Fuller chose to set the lyrics to the tune of melody, "On the Banks of the Old Dundee", a popular Scottish melody regarded as a drinking song, and titled the song for the Raritan River.

Composition and history
Rutgers College student Edwin E. Colburn (class of 1876) organized the college's Glee Club, an all-male choral ensemble, after noticing that Rutgers was not included when the first edition of the Carmina Collegensia (1869) was published and advertised as a complete collection of American college songs.  In 1873, on the night of a performance in Metuchen, New Jersey, Colburn approached his fellow student Howard Newton Fuller (1853– ), to compose a tune and some lyrics that the club could use as an official school song, or alma mater.

Fuller wrote the lyrics in two hours setting them to the tune of a popular melody On the Banks of the Old Dundee. According to a later interview with the Rutgers Alumni Monthly, Fuller stated he chose "On the Banks of the Old Dundee" as the song "immediately struck me that the air of that song had the right melody and the stirring and martial swing for an effective college song."

"On the Banks of the Old Raritan" and thirteen other Rutgers songs appeared in the second edition of the Carmina Collegensia, published in 1876.

It is often sung at university occasions, including performances of the Rutgers University Glee Club, and other campus musical groups, at convocation and commencement exercises, and especially at the conclusion of athletic events.

An altered version of the song is sung at Rutgers University-Camden commencement ceremonies incorporating the lyrics "on the banks of the old Delaware" and references to Leaves of Grass by the poet Walt Whitman.

Lyrics
While there are five verses to the song, typically only the first and last (fifth) verse are sung.

Current Lyrics (2013)

Revised lyrics (1914)

Original lyrics (1873)

In August 2013, The Rutgers University Glee Club debuted a revision to the first verse, written by Rutgers Director of Choral Studies Patrick Gardner. The lyrics, "My father sent me to old Rutgers, and resolved that I should be a man" has been changed to a gender-neutral "From far and near we came to Rutgers, and resolved to learn all that we can." The following line was also changed to "we settled down" instead of "I settled down". These lyrics were carefully changed so that whether you choose to sing the Howard Fuller 1873 lyrics or the gender-inclusive revision, the vowel color are unified across both. (I.E. "Father" matches "Far", the word "resolved" remained the same, "man" and "can", etc.) The revision has been accepted by the university. 

In 1989, several years after Rutgers became coeducational (1972), the University's administration changed the official lyrics to reflect to be gender-neutral, substituting the words "my friends" in place of Fuller's original words "my boys" in the first line of the chorus.

Over the years, several organizations on campus have penned additional verses, informal interjections, as well as parodies of these lyrics.

References

External links
 
 Rutgers University
 Rutgers University Glee Club
 The mp3 of the amended 1989 version of the song can be downloaded here

Rutgers University
American college songs
Alma mater songs
1873 songs